Louise Hindsgavl (born January 29, 1973) is a Danish artist who works in ceramic sculpture, porcelain, and stoneware.

Early life and education
Hindsgavl graduated from the Ceramics and Glass Department of Design School Kolding in 1999.

Career
Hindsgavl began her work with ceramics by designing dishes. She later began to create contemporary sculpture.  Particularly influenced by Rococo, Hindsgavl's sculptures unexpectedly depict startling and controversial subjects in a medium which is more commonly used for decorative folk art. 

Her work has been presented at several museum exhibitions, galleries and international Biennale of Ceramics:

 2007 Grimmerhus - CLAY Museum of international Ceramic Art, DK 
 2010 BICC, Biennale of Contemporary Ceramics, Vallauris, France 
 2014 Rønnebæksholm - Power, Porcelain, Poetry, Næstved, DK
 2015 Höganäs Kunsthall & Museum, Höganäs, Sweden - Power. Porcelæn. Poesi. 
 2016 Artmuseum Trapholt, ERUPTURE, Kolding, DK 
 2019 Becoming Undone, Hans Alf Gallery, DK 
 2023 Holmegaard Værk - The Chosen Ones, Holmegaard 

For updated list, see artists homepage

Public Collections 
 2009  Represented in the collection of Ny Carlsbergfondet
 2009	Represented at the World Ceramic Exposition Foundation, South Korea
 2010 	Musée Historique et des Porcelaines, Nyon, Switzerland
 2010	Musée Ariana (The Swiss Museum of Ceramics and Glass). Geneva, Switzerland
 2010	National Museum of Sweden, Stockholm, Sweden
 2010	Sale to the collection of the Victoria and Albert Museum, London, UK
 2012 	ASU Art Museum, Arizona, USA

Exhibits, catalogues and publications
 2005	 Dansk Kunst 2005
 2006 	 KeramikMagazinEuropa, vol.28, "Hollow Laughter" by Trine Ross
 2007 	"Kulturo", Spring '07, "I Porcelæn til Anklerne", by Andreas Nielsen
 2007 	"Clay in Art, International, "Burlesque Tableaus" by Jorunn Veiteberg
 2007 	"All Great Things Starts with Blasphemy, Ceramics, Art and Perception, Issue 68, 2007, by Tom Jørgensen
 2008 	"Fragiles, Porcelain, Glass & Ceramics", Gestalten Verlag.
 2008	 "Mod I Ler", interview i Living Design
 2009	"Contemporary Ceramics", Emmanuel Cooper, Thames & Hudson
 2009 	"101 Kunstnere", JA
 2009	"Once Upon a Chair", Gestalten Verlag.
 2011	Cuts & Bruises at SODA, exhibit and catalogue
 2011	Living with Ceramics, TL magazine, issue 11.

Grants and awards 

Hindsgavl was given a Young Designers Award in 1997 by SNBA, Nacional des Belas Artes, Lisbon, Portugal. She received grants from the Foundation of L.F. Foght and from the Foundation of Gudrund og Erik Kauffeldt in 1999. In 2000 and 2001 she received the Grant for Young Artists from the Danish Art Foundation, as well as four subsequent grants in later years.  She has also received grants from Danmarks Nationalbanks Jubilæumsfond, The Solar Foundation and the Silkeborg Art association, and the Silversmith Kay Bojesen and wife Erna Bojesens Memorial foundation. In 2004 she received the Biennale Award at the Biennale of Arts and Craft and Design and in 2006 she was presented with the Annie and Otto Detlefs' Award for Young Ceramicists In 2015 she received the Prince Eugen Medal, conferred by the King of Sweden.
The Anne Marie Telmany, born Carl-Nielsen, Grant for Female Artists (2018)

References 

1973 births
Living people
21st-century Danish ceramists
Danish potters
Danish sculptors
Danish women artisans
Danish women ceramists
Danish women sculptors
Recipients of the Prince Eugen Medal
Women potters